Swing is the fifteenth and final studio album by Australian soul and R&B singer Renée Geyer. The album was released on 19 April 2013 and peaked at number 22 on the ARIA Charts.

Swing is Geyer's big band interpretation of classics as well as remakes of two of her own hits, "Say I Love You" and  "It's a Man's Man's Man's World". Geyer told The Sydney Morning Herald that Swing was inspired by Frank Sinatra's 1966 recording with Count Basie in Las Vegas, an album she had long admired. It took the success of Michael Buble to convince her that she should lend her distinctive voice to a big-band album.

Geyer toured the album across 2013. At the 2013 ARIA Music Awards, the album was nominated for Best Jazz Album, losing to Smile by the Idea Of North.

Track listing 
 "Baby Please Don't Go" (Joe Williams) - 2:55
 "I Got Rhythm" (George Gershwin, Ira Gershwin) - 3:37
 "I Wanna Be Around" (Johnny Mercer, Sadie Vimmerstedt) - 2:19
 "Fly Me to the Moon" (Bart Howard) - 2:54
 "Comin' Home Baby"  (with Paul Kelly)  (Ben Tucker, Bob Dorough) - 3:28
 "Alfie" (Burt Bacharach, Hal David) - 3:46
 "Say I Love You" (Eddy Grant) - 4:11
 "What a Wonderful World" (Bob Thiele, George David Weiss) - 5:24
 "My Funny Valentine" (Richard Rodgers, Lorenz Hart) - 5:12
 "Somewhere" (Leonard Bernstein, Stephen Sondheim) - 5:28
 "It's a Man's Man's World" (Betty Jean Newsome, James Brown) - 5:57

Personnel
 Philip Rex - acoustic bass
 Julien Wilson - alto saxophone, clarinet, bass clarinet
 Lachlan Davidson - alto saxophone, flute
 Tim Wilson - alto saxophone, flute
 Paul Williamson - baritone saxophone, tenor saxophone, clarinet
 David Beck - drums, percussion
 Bruce Haymes - electric piano, organ [Hammond]
 Lachlan Davidson - flute
 Sam Lemann - guitar
 Sam Keevers - piano
 Carlo Barbaro - tenor saxophone, clarinet
 David Palmer - trombone
 Jordan Murray - trombone
 Nick Mulder - trombone
 Simon Scerri - trombone [bass]
 Eamon McNelis - trumpet
 Gianni Marinucci - trumpet
 Greg Spence - trumpet
 Ross Irwin - trumpet
 Scott Tinkler - trumpet

Reception

Robert Rigby from FanFare Records said that "The album is a collection of wonderful songs delivered by Renee in a tour de force. On this record she had a great deal especially with her great friend Paul Kelly on a classic Mel Torme song "Comin' Home Baby"."

Cameron Adams from the Herald Sun wrote that "Timeless songs delivered by a timeless voice - sometimes it's that easy. Australian national treasure Renée Geyer is completely at home in front of a big band, joyfully losing herself in standards. Her mate Paul Kelly shows he can even pull off jazz duetting on the Mel Torme hit "Comin' Home Baby". Geyer also uses the opportunity to revisit some of her biggest hits, "Say I Love You" is injected with a Latin carnival feel that is infectious, while after all the times she's sung it she still causes instant goosebumps on "It's a Man's Man's Man's World"." adding that "[it is] the kind of album they used to make".

Charts

Weekly charts

Year-end charts

Release history

References 

2013 albums
Renée Geyer albums
Covers albums
Big band albums
Blues albums by Australian artists
Jazz albums by Australian artists